Rok Ovniček (born 29 January 1995) is a Slovenian handball player who plays for HBC Nantes and the Slovenian national team.

He represented Slovenia at the 2020 European Men's Handball Championship.

References

External links

1995 births
Living people
Sportspeople from Slovenj Gradec
Slovenian male handball players
Expatriate handball players
Slovenian expatriate sportspeople in France
Mediterranean Games competitors for Slovenia
Competitors at the 2018 Mediterranean Games
21st-century Slovenian people